The Prosperity and Solidarity Party (PSP) is a political party in Rwanda.

History
The PSP contested the 2008 elections as part of the Rwandan Patriotic Front-led coalition, winning a single seat. It did not run in the 2013 elections.

References

External links
Official website

Political parties in Rwanda